Lustleigh is a small village and civil parish nestled in the Wrey Valley, inside the Dartmoor National Park in Devon, England. It is between the towns of Bovey Tracey and Moretonhampstead.

The village is focused around the parish church of St John the Baptist.  Surrounding this are old buildings, many of which are thatched. There is a village shop, garage (no fuel), tea room and a pub. There is a convenience store with a Post Office Local.

History of the village
The area where Lustleigh now stands has been inhabited since before records began as shown by the remains of stone hut circles, which can still be seen in the 'Cleave' (meaning 'Cliff' or 'Cleft', which is the defining geological feature of the valley) and the presence of an ancient burial monument "Datuidoc's Stone" which dates from before 600 AD.

In the 899 will of King Alfred the Great, a copy of which is in the British Library, Lustleigh (then known as Suðeswyrðe) was left to his youngest son Æthelweard.

Whilst the name Lustleigh (or any variation) is not found in the Domesday Book of 1086, it is believed that the village was recorded under the name of Sutreworde, Anglo-Saxon for 'south of the wood'.

At that time, the Lord of the Manor was Ansgar, who controlled 12 farms of around 1,200 acres (4.9 km2) plus a large area of forest.  Unusually for the Domesday Book, beekeeping was mentioned as a key activity of the parish.  At the time of the Domesday Survey, there were around 155 people living in the village.

The manor of Lustleigh was bought by Sir John Wadham Justice of the Common Pleas in 1403 and stayed in the Wadham family for eight generations, when it formed part of the estate of Nicholas Wadham (1531-1609), co-founder of Wadham College, Oxford. It continued as an estate manor in the hands of heirs of the Wadhams, the Earls of Ilchester, until the beginning of the 19th century, when it was  broken up and sold off.

Over time, the village expanded from its original boundaries (signified by the Bishop's stone at Caseley as the entrance, and the Wrey brook in the valley), to encompass the area beyond the Wrey brook (known as Wreyland) which was previously a separate village – although its residents attended Lustleigh's parish church – and out to Brookfield (in 1957).

Lustleigh now

The village has a population of between 600 and 700 (614 at the 1991 census), who are served by a number of public amenities, which include:
 The Village Hall – reopened in February 2005 (much enlarging and improving the previous facility).
 The Dairy – the village shop, with everyday grocery items and locally produced specialities.  The building is owned by the village, and leased to a shopkeeper.  Limited Post-office facilities are now available in The Dairy.
 The Cleave Public House – the local pub, which was converted from a farmhouse into 'The Cleave Hotel' with the coming of the railway to the village.

Places of interest
 Celtic Cross – a granite monument in front of the church on the village green, next to the Primrose Cottage tea rooms, and up the hill from the Gospel Hall on Wreyland path.
 Wreyland – This area of Lustleigh is considered picturesque, due to the large number of thatched houses, including Wreyland Manor, Souther Wreyland, Yonder Wreyland and the Tallet House. Wreyland was not formerly a part of Lustleigh, but was incorporated into the village in the 19th century.  The track that leads from Knowle Road into the village centre is called the Wreyland Path.
 The Orchard – common land donated to the village some years ago, with a children's playground. A large granite boulder, topped by a granite throne, is used for the annual coronation of the May Queen (see Lustleigh May Queen below).
 Kelly Mine, Devon – old mine workings, occasionally opened to the public.  Opened for tours at other times by appointment.
 The Cleave – Lustleigh Cleave, meaning "cliff" or "cleft", is the large geological feature from which the village pub derives its name.  Paths criss-cross the Cleave (which is mostly common land) and surrounding fields, meadows and woods.  Walkers may enjoy the views to the moor from the ridge or the lazy bubble of the River Bovey as it flows along the wooded valley bottom.  Wildlife to be seen includes deer, rare butterflies and the pretty river bird, the dipper.  In early June the slopes are covered in masses of bluebells and foxgloves.
 Pullabrook Woods – These woods are managed in parts by the Woodland Trust, English Nature and Dartmoor National park, nestle at the foot of the moors, and are a destination for walkers and riders.  They are accessible from the village, either along Knowle Road, to where the twin bridges over the Wrey run, or from Rudge down either the Heaven's Gate or Hisley paths.
 The Bishop's Stone – Commemorating the visit of a Bishop of Exeter, although it is not known which bishop. This stone, at the bottom of Caseley Hill and the top of the station approach road can still be seen, although worn by years of neglect.
 Datuidoc's Stone – Lustleigh's most ancient monument, dating from around 550–600 AD is now in the church, and marked a burial site in a graveyard on the site of the present church.

Places of worship
Lustleigh has three places of worship:

Church of St John the Baptist

The church of St John the Baptist is the village's Church of England parish church. It is at the centre of the village.

The oval shape of the churchyard suggests that a Romano-British burial ground may have first occupied this site.  This conjecture is supported by the presence of Datuidoc's Stone in the north aisle (originally in the porch), dating from around 550–600 AD.

The first part of the church, including the basic rectangle and the south porch, was built around 1250. The south chapel was added in the early 14th century by the Lord of the Manor, Sir William le Prouse.  The church tower was built in the late 14th century.  In the 15th century the north aisle was built, including removal of the north wall and replacing it with pillars.

The last major addition to the church was the vestry, built in Victorian times.

The church graveyard contains the remains of former Lustleigh residents.  The graveyard is now full, and with the exception of those with family plots, new burials take place at the modern cemetery on Mill Lane.  A memorial lamp, donated by James Nutcombe Gould (1849–1899) and his wife Edith (1859–1900), is now a Grade II listed object.

Church bells
In 1553, the inventory of church goods lists Lustleigh as having four bells, which was normal at the time (most churches having either three or four).  In October 1864 the Reverend H. T. Ellacombe recorded that Lustleigh had four bells, cast by Thomas Castleman Bilbie of Cullompton in 1799.  The Bilbie family were prolific founders and bellhangers and examples of their work still exist in Devon.  These Bilbie bells would almost certainly have been recast from the metal of the previous bells, probably near the church as transporting bells once cast was difficult. Two of the inscriptions on the bells included the names of the churchwardens of the time, Elias Cuming and John Amery, although Ellacombe's notes spell Cuming differently on each bell; this may be an error on his part or more probably on the part of the foundry.

In 1875 William Aggett of Chagford, a local bellhanger, hung a fifth bell, a new treble, in the tower; it was cast by Taylors bellfoundry of Loughborough who also cast a sixth, a tenor, in 1890 and who are still in business.  In 1923 Gillett & Johnston of Croydon recast all six and these are the bells that hang in the church today and ring out on Sunday morning and other times.  The inscription of the old bells was reproduced on the new bells, although Gillett & Johnston reproduced the name "Bilbie" as "Billie" on every bell.  The bells were substantially overhauled in 2008 by Nicholson Bellhangers and the tower steeple keeper Robert Brown of Bovey Tracey.

East Dartmoor Baptist Church
The Baptist Church is on Rudge Hill, and was built in around 1853 by people of the village, most notably including the large Amery family, who have one of the longest associations with the village.

Gospel Hall
The Gospel Hall is below the village green, next to the Primrose Cottage tea rooms, on the Wreyland path. The congregation was formed in the 1900s when worship was conducted in the homes of adherents.  Sometime in the early 20th century, Mrs L. A. Whiteside made the building available to the congregation.  This continued until 1971, when the congregation purchased the building from the landlord.  In recent years the hall has fallen into disuse.  In 2021, the hall was sold to a local builder who is in the process of renovating the building.

Roman Catholic Chapel
There was previously a private Roman Catholic chapel, beside Pixies Cottage on Mapstone Hill.  The owner, Dolly Walmsley, moved away in 1984, leading to the sale of the cottage and chapel, and the cessation of church services.

Village events

May Day celebrations

The May Day celebrations are the biggest event of the year for the village, with a carnival procession, maypole dancing, and crowning of the May Queen. The May Day tradition had lapsed until 1905, when Cecil Torr revived it. The celebrations have since been held on the first Saturday in May. Initially the 'crowning' took place on a hillside above Greyland. The granite boulder where the ceremony took place has inscribed upon it the names of all the May Queens up to the beginning of the Second World War when the event was suspended due to the sinister nature of 'crowning' young village girls in an inaccessible woodland on the outskirts of the village.

In 1954, the celebrations were again revived and moved to the Town Orchard where the May Queen's throne was erected on a rock. Like its predecessor this rock, known as the May Day Rock, has the names of all the May Queens inscribed on it from 1954 to the present. In May 2000 a new throne was unveiled at the May Day celebrations. The throne was cut from granite from the nearby Blackingstone Quarry. It was designed by Doug Cooper and carved by Warren Pappas; on it is inscribed 'MM'.

The May Queens since the revival in 1905 were:

Lustleigh Village Show and Dance
On August Bank Holiday Monday the village hosts a large show, which in 2010 attracted more than 4500 visitors.  The show has classes for items ranging from fruit and vegetables to photography, as well as a horse show and a dog show. There are also stalls and activities, a 10 km charity run, terrier racing, displays from local charities and sheep shearing demonstrations.

The show is usually held in the fields at Kelly Farm, although during the Foot and Mouth year it was held on the field next to the cricket field.

It is not known when the show started, but it gradually grew to incorporate the local flower show, previously held at the Conservative Hall (where the village hall now stands). Until 1990, the Lustleigh horticultural society organised the show, but subsequently a separate committee organised it.  In 1998, this split further, with the growing horse show being organised separately from the rest of the show.

Surplus funds raised from the show are spent in the village on numerous community projects and good causes. Thus far more than £15,000 has been reinvested in the village.

The show is sometimes preceded on the Saturday by the "can't miss" show dance: the locals gather in the show tent for music, dinner and dancing. For the dance most of the village dresses in costume for a night's entertainment in a themed tent. The music is often provided by a local band, such as Scratch, who have featured in the show since 1997.

The Railway and Lustleigh

Lustleigh Station, and the smaller Hawkmoor or Pullabrook Halt, were stops on the Moretonhampstead and South Devon Railway, a 12.3-mile (20 km) branch of the South Devon Main Line from Newton Abbot to Moretonhampstead.

The Moretonhampstead and South Devon Railway company was formed in 1861, and work on the line commenced in 1863. The line opened to the public in 1866 and converted from broad gauge to standard gauge in 1892.

The railway brought tourists to the area, and this led to local business flourishing. The conveniently placed Gatehouse Farm was converted into the Cleave Hotel, still the village pub to this day. The railway was also used by local industries: farmers' produce, nursery plants and blacksmiths' products were all sent by train.

The railway also served the nearby Hawkmoor County Sanatorium which was a tuberculosis isolation hospital, just outside the village, with a specific station called Hawkmoor Halt (later Pullabrook Halt), near to Pullabrook woods at the edge of the village.

The station was used in 1931 for the film 'Hound of the Baskervilles', its name being temporarily changed (Ewans 1964).

Railway traffic grew until the 1930s when it went into decline. Despite a significant summer tourist trade, being featured in many contemporary guide books to the region, traffic was not enough to cover rising costs.

In 1957, the possibility of closure was reported in the Mid Devon Advertiser. In 1959 the last passenger service ran, although freight trains continued.  The line closed in 1964 (several years before the Beeching axe).

Several miles of the line between Bovey Tracey and Lustleigh, some of which is now a public path, are planned by the council to become a cycle track. The old Lustleigh station house is visible from the old railway bridge at Brookfield, as are the Brookfield, Caseley and Knowle bridges, and is now lived in as a home.

References

Bibliography
 Torr, Cecil (1918) Small Talk at Wreyland. 3 series. Cambridge University Press, 1918, 1921, 1923 (combined edition by Adams & Dart, 1970)
 Ewans, M. C. (1964) The Haytor Granite Tramway & Stover Canal. Newton Abbot: David & Charles; p. 43
 Crowdy, J. (ed) (2001) The Book of Lustleigh. Halsgrove

External links

 Entry in Kelly's Directory of Devon & Cornwall, 1893
 The Lustleigh Society
 Lustleigh show Website
 Lustleigh Village Hall Home Page
 Information about Kelly Mine
 Photographs from the Lustleigh Society collection, in the Dartmoor Archive

Dartmoor
Villages in Devon
Civil parishes in Devon